Robert B. Holladay (born March 13, 1932) is a former American football player who played for San Francisco 49ers  and Los Angeles Rams of the National Football League (NFL). He played college football at the University of Tulsa.

References

1932 births
Living people
American football defensive backs
San Francisco 49ers players
Los Angeles Rams players
Tulsa Golden Hurricane football players